The rivière du Grand Portage Sud-Ouest (English: Grand Portage South-West River) is a tributary of rivière du Grand Portage, flowing into the unorganized territory of Lac-Ashuapmushuan in the Le Domaine-du-Roy Regional County Municipality, in the administrative region of Saguenay–Lac-Saint-Jean, in the province of Quebec, in Canada.

The valley of the Grand Portage Sud-Ouest river is mainly served by the forest road R0204 which goes up all this valley and connects to the south to the road R0406. Route R0204 connect north to route 167

Forestry (mainly forestry) is the main economic activity in this valley; secondly, recreational tourism activities, mainly because of the Ashuapmushuan Wildlife Reserve.

Geography 
The Grand Portage Sud-Ouest river draws its source from Lake Hary.

This spring is located in a mountainous area in the unorganized territory of Lac-Ashuapmushuan, at:
  east of forest road R024;
  east of the course of the rivière du Grand Portage;
  southwest of the old Frigon station of the Canadian National railway;
  southwest of the course of the Ashuapmushuan River.

  towards the north, in particular crossing Lake Odile (length:  elongated in shape, with two widenings;), up to a bend in the river;
  eastward through the north side of a mountain whose summit reaches , until the discharge (coming from the south) of a set of lakes;
  towards the north first in a sometimes steep-sided valley, collecting a stream (coming from the southeast) and another stream (coming from the east), forming a few large coils irregular, and by cutting the forest road R0204 at the end of the segment, to its mouth.

The Rivière du Grande Portage Sud-Ouest flows onto the south bank of the Rivière du Grand Portage. This confluence is located at:
  southeast of the mouth of the Grand Portage river;
  southwest of the mouth of the Chigoubiche River;
  west of downtown Saint-Félicien.

Toponymy 
The toponym "rivière du Grand Portage Sud-Ouest" was made official on December 5, 1968, at the Place Names Bank of the Commission de toponymie du Québec.

See also 
 Lac-Ashuapmushuan, an unorganized territory
 Ashuapmushuan Wildlife Reserve
 Chigoubiche River
 Ashuapmushuan River
 Rivière du Grand Portage
 List of rivers of Quebec

References 

Rivers of Saguenay–Lac-Saint-Jean
Le Domaine-du-Roy Regional County Municipality